The louvar or luvar (Luvarus imperialis) is a species of perciform fish, the only extant species in the genus Luvarus and family Luvaridae.  It is closely related to the surgeonfish.  The juvenile form has a pair of spines near the base of the tail, like the surgeonfish, though they are lost in the adult.

It is pink in color and possesses a characteristic bulging forehead.

It feeds on jellyfish, ctenophores, and other soft-bodied planktonic animals. It is hardly ever found in fish markets in the United States, only as bycatch, but is prized as an eating fish.

Extinct taxa

One extinct species in the genus Luvaris and two extinct genera are only known from fossils dating back to the Paleogene, three extinct genera if one includes Kushlukia of the monotypic Kushlukiidae:  
 Luvaris necopinatus (from the Danata formation)
 Avitoluvarus (from the Danata Formation)
 Beerichthys (from the London Clay fauna)
 Kushlukia (sister taxon of Luvaridae)

References

External links
 
 
 
 "Phylogenetic Revision of the Fish Families Luvaridae and †Kushlukiidae (Acanthuroidei), with a New Genus and Two New Species of Eocene Luvarids" Contains information about Luvaridae and Kushlukiidae (Acanthuroidei).

 
Fish described in 1810
Taxa named by Constantine Samuel Rafinesque